19 Aquarii is a star in the zodiac constellation of Aquarius. With an apparent magnitude of about 5.7, the star is barely visible to the naked eye as a white-hued star (see Bortle scale). Parallax estimates put it at a distance of about 260 light years away from the Sun. The star is moving closer to the Earth with a heliocentric radial velocity of −21 km/s.

This object is an A-type main-sequence star with a stellar classification of A8V. It is around 788 million years old with a fairly fast rotation rate, as its projected rotational velocity is about 155 km/s, so it must be rotating at least that fast. It has 1.86 times the mass of the Sun and 2.76 times the Sun's radius. 19 Aquarii is radiating 26 times the luminosity of the Sun from its photosphere at an effective temperature of 8,078 K. Eggen has this star flagged as a blue straggler and a member of the HR1614 supercluster.

References

A-type main-sequence stars
Blue stragglers
Aquarius (constellation)
Durchmusterung objects
Aquarii, 019
203875
105761
8195

zh:天鷹座19